"La Paloma" is a song by Sebastián Iradier.

La Paloma may also refer to:

Places
 La Paloma, Paraguay, a town
 La Paloma, Texas, United States, a census-designated place
 La Paloma, Durazno, Uruguay, a village
 La Paloma, Montevideo, Uruguay, a barrio (neighborhood)
 La Paloma, Rocha, Uruguay, a small city
 La Paloma Glacier, a glacier northeast of Santiago, Chile
 La Paloma Lake, an artificial lake southeast of Ovalle, Chile

Other uses
 La paloma, a moth found in Colombia
 La Paloma (film), a 1959 West German film
 La Paloma (painting), a 1904 painting by Isidre Nonell
 La Paloma (TV series), a 1995 Mexican telenovela
 La Paloma Theater, a movie theater in Encinitas, California, U.S.

See also
 La Paloma-Lost Creek, Texas, U.S., a census-designated place
 Paloma (disambiguation)